The Division Sardinia was a infantry division of the Wehrmacht during World War II.

History 
The Division Sardinia was formed on May 12, 1943 in Sardinia from the staff of the Sturmbrigade XI (11th Assault Brigade).  It became division strength just as the Army Group Africa was surrendering in Tunisia.  The original reason for the creation of the division was due to its exposure to the allies after the "official" end of Operation Torch.  Because the invasion of Sardinia never happened the division was "de-mobilized" and helped the re-incarnation of the 90th Panzergrenadier Division. in 1943.

Organization 
Organization of the Division just before its change of name:

 Headquarters (Former Stab, Sturmbrigade XI)
 Sardinisches Panzerbataillon - (Sardinian Panzer Battalion)
 1. Sarinian Panzergrenadier Regiment - 1st Sarinian Panzergrenadier Regiment
 2. Sarinian Panzergrenadier Regiment - 2nd Sardinian Panzergrenadier Regiment
 190. Artillerie-Regiment - 190th Artillery Regiment - Former Sardinian Artillery Regiment
 190. Panzerzerstörer-Bataillon - 190th Tank Destroyer Battalion
 190. Pionere Bataillon- 190th Engineer Battalion - Former Sardinian Engineer Battalion
 190. Signalbataillon - 190th Signal Battalion - Former Sardinian Signal Company

References 

German panzergrenadier divisions